is a Japanese professional wrestler, currently working  for the professional wrestling promotion Pro Wrestling Zero1 (Zero1), where he is a former United National Heavyweight Champion.

Professional wrestling career

Independent circuit (2017–present)
Iwasaki worked for the defunct Wrestle-1 (W-1) for a brief period of time. On the third night of the W-1 WRESTLE-1 Tour 2019 Sunrise from January 20, he unsuccessfully challenged Kaz Hayashi. At WAVE Niigata WAVE ~ Hiroe Nagahama Local Triumphant , an event promoted by Pro Wrestling Wave on February 4, 2018, he scored a victory against Keisuke Goto.

Pro Wrestling Zero1 (2017–present)
Iwasaki made his professional wrestling debut at the ZERO1 Ikuto Hidaka Pro-Wrestling Debut 20th Anniversary event from October 13, 2017 promoted by Pro Wrestling Zero1 (Zero1), where he picked up a victory over Shoji Fukushima. At ZERO1 Sayonara West Holy Land Hakata Star Lanes on March 10, 2019, Iwasaki defeated Shogun Okamoto to win the United National Heavyweight Championship. He worked in cross-over events such as BJW/ZERO1 Clash I, a show promoted by both Big Japan Pro Wrestling and Zero1 on April 24, 2019, where he teamed up with Shoki Kitamura and Kohei Sato and fell short to Daisuke Sekimoto & Okami (Daichi Hashimoto and Hideyoshi Kamitani) in a six-man tag team match. At BJW/ZERO1/2AW 3 Groups Joint Performance, a cross-over event promoted by Big Japan Pro Wrestling, Pro Wrestling Zero1 and Active Advance Pro Wrestling on August 11, 2020, Iwasaki teamed up with Takuya Nomura and Tank Nagai in a losing effort to Ayato Yoshida, Daisuke Sekimoto and Masato Tanaka.

He participated in signature events of the promotion. One of them is the Fire Festival and at the 2018 edition of the event he placed himself in the Block A, scoring a total of ten points after competing against Yuko Miyamoto, Masato Tanaka, Jiro Kuroshio, Shogun Okamoto, Chris Vice and Takuya Sugawara.  At the 2019 edition of the event, he scored his best performance by winning the Block B with a total of nineteen points over Yuko Miyamoto, Masashi Takeda, Kohei Sato, Takuya Sugawara, Shogun Okamoto and Yasu Kubota. He lastly fell short into the finals to Yuji Hino.

Another important event promoted by Pro Wrestling Zero1 in which Iwasaki took part is the Furinkazan Tag Tournament, making his first appearance at the 2019 edition, where he teamed up with Kohei Sato, defeating Yasu Kubota and Hide Kubota in the first-round, Masato Tanaka and Tetsuhiro Kuroda in the semi-finals, but fell short to Yuji Hino and Yuji Okabayashi in the finals. At the 2020 edition he teamed up with his New Spirits tag team partner Tsugutaka Sato, falling short to The Kubota Brothers (Yasu Kubota and Hide Kubota) in the first round from December 19, 2020.

Personal life 
Outside of the ring, Iwasaki works as a personal trainer for a fitness center called FLENJI. The gym is owned by Ikuto Hidaka and employs fellow wrestlers Munenori Sawa and Fuminori Abe.

Championships and accomplishments
Pro Wrestling Zero1
United National Heavyweight Championship (1 time)
Intercontinental Tag Team Championship (1 time) – with Tsugutaka Sato

References 

1998 births
Living people
Sportspeople from Shimane Prefecture
Japanese male professional wrestlers